A Face in the Crowd is a 1957 American satirical drama film directed by Elia Kazan and starring Andy Griffith (in his film debut), Patricia Neal and Walter Matthau. The screenplay is by Budd Schulberg and is based on his short story "Your Arkansas Traveler", from the collection Some Faces in the Crowd (1953).

The story centers on Larry "Lonesome" Rhodes, a drifter who is discovered by the producer (Neal) of a small-market radio program in rural northeast Arkansas. Rhodes ultimately rises to great fame and influence on national television. The character was inspired by Schulberg's acquaintance with Will Rogers Jr. The successes of Arthur Godfrey and Tennessee Ernie Ford were also acknowledged in the screenplay.

The film launched Griffith into stardom but got mixed reviews upon its original release. Later decades have seen favorable reappraisals of the movie. In  2008 it was selected for preservation in the United States National Film Registry by the Library of Congress as "culturally, historically, or aesthetically significant".

Plot
In late 1950s America, radio journalist Marcia Jeffries encounters a drunken drifter, Larry Rhodes, while recording a segment at a rural Arkansas jail. She invites him to speak to the audience and sing while playing his guitar, and his raw voice, folksy humor and personal charm make him instantly popular. Marcia dubs him "Lonesome" Rhodes and fast-tracks him onto his own radio program.

Marcia enlists the support of the show's staff writer Mel Miller and witnesses the charismatic Rhodes ad-lib his way to Memphis-area popularity, effectively criticizing local politicians along the way.

When he pokes fun at his sponsor, a mattress company, it initially pulls its ads, but when his adoring audience revolts, burning mattresses in the street, the sponsor discovers that Rhodes's irreverent pitches actually increased sales by 55%, and Rhodes returns to the air with a new awareness of his persuasive power. He begins an affair with Marcia and proposes to her.

An ambitious office worker at the mattress company, Joey DePalma, puts together a deal for Rhodes to star in a new TV show in New York City. The sponsor is Vitajex, an energy supplement that Rhodes ingeniously reimagines as a yellow pill marketed as a male enhancement product. As his fame, influence, and ego increase, Rhodes is enlisted to improve the appeal of presidential hopeful Senator Worthington Fuller of California, and rebrands the stuffy conservative as an everyman with the folksy nickname "Curly".

In contrast to his friendly onscreen persona, Rhodes has privately become an egomaniac who berates his staff. Marcia's hopes of marrying Rhodes are dashed, first when a woman turns up claiming to be his legitimate wife, and then when he returns from alleged divorce proceedings in Mexico, newly married to 17-year-old drum majorette Betty Lou. Rhodes and Marcia enter into a profit-sharing agreement after she reminds him of her role in his success.

Ultimately, Rhodes's ascent into fame and arrogance begins to turn on him. Joey has an affair with Rhodes's young wife. Rhodes dumps her and sends her back to Arkansas, but can't get out of his business arrangement with Joey, who threatens to reveal Rhodes's secrets.

Rhodes visits Marcia, who has come to regret her role in making him famous while he proposed his "Fighters for Fuller" proposal. While Rhodes gets comfortable, Marcia leaves in the rain. To destroy him, she activates a live microphone over the end credits of his TV show that reveals Rhodes contemptuously mocking Fuller and the station's "idiot" viewers. His popularity and the show's ratings plummet, and the advertisers cancel their sponsorships, as Rhodes descends in a metaphorical elevator down to the ground floor.

Rhodes returns to his penthouse, where he was scheduled to address the nation's business and political elite, only to find the room empty, except for his friend, Beanie, and a few Black servants, whom he dismisses when they don't respond to his demands. He discovers the truth during a phone call with Mel and Marcia and threatens suicide, but Marcia only goads him on. When the pair arrive at Rhodes's home, they find him speaking with an applause machine replacing the people whose support he lost. Marcia tells Rhodes that she was responsible for his open-microphone incident and demands that he never call her again.

Before they leave, Mel lays out a prediction of Rhodes's future: his career is not completely over, and he will likely find further TV work soon, but never again enjoy the same level of popularity and prestige. After leaving the building, Mel and Marcia hear Rhodes screaming from the penthouse, for Marcia to return to him, but ignore him as they depart into the night in a taxi, as a Coca-Cola sign in neon lights flashes continuously.

Cast

Production

Development
The film was produced under the working title of The Arkansas Traveler. Director Elia Kazan said that he and screenwriter Budd Schulberg had based the character of Lonesome Rhodes on Arthur Godfrey as well as Billy Graham and Huey Long.

Casting
Contemporary newspapers reported an early 1956 trip by Kazan to Sarasota, Florida, to confer with Schulberg. Late in April, columnist Walter Winchell wrote that Andy Griffith was due to leave the cast of his Broadway show No Time for Sergeants at the end of July, vacation for a month, and then begin shooting with Kazan. Kazan and Schulberg spent much of July and August 1956 in Memphis and in Arkansas, with Patricia Neal's involvement being announced by early August.

Griffith, Lee Remick, Charles Irving, and uncrediteds Lois Nettleton and Rip Torn all made their film debuts in A Face in the Crowd.

In stage performance, Griffith noted, he would work gradually up to his most intense moments, but needed to conjure that up spontaneously when shooting such scenes for Kazan. In some instances, he asked to have a few discarded chairs available to destroy, in order to work up his rage before filming.

Big Jeff Bess, who portrayed the Sheriff under his own name, was a country singer and bandleader in Nashville who led Big Jeff and his Radio Playboys. He was once married to Tootsie Bess, owner of Tootsie's Orchid Lounge. Real-life personalities who make cameo appearances in the film include Walter Winchell and Mike Wallace.

Filming

Most of the film's interiors were shot in New York at the Biograph Studios in the Bronx. This was preceded by shooting in Memphis and Piggott, Arkansas, where Rhodes meets Betty Lou.

The most involved location shoot was in Poplar Bluff, Missouri, standing in for Piggott in the fair and baton-twirling competition scenes. Five thousand extras were sought, to be fed and paid $1 hourly for a mid-August day's work. Sixty baton twirlers and musicians from six different high school bands were rounded up from Arkansas and Missouri. Remick reported spending two weeks in Piggott living with teen twirler Amanda Robinson and her family, working on her twirling and local accent. Some of her baton-twirling scenes used a double. At the Piggott location shoot some 380 dogs were assembled from Missouri and Arkansas for the scene following Rhodes's first mass-action call on his audience: to take their dogs to the home of a local sheriff who was running for higher office to find out if a candidate is worthy of the office of dog catcher.

Shooting in New York included 61 sets at Biograph Studios as well as some exteriors. The scene of the network headquarters switchboard was NBC, 30 Rockefeller Plaza. Anthony Franciosa, eager to work with Kazan, had turned down a more lucrative offer to appear in MGM's The Vintage. Schulberg remained involved throughout: "I went on a trip in 1955 to scout a location in Arkansas, and I've been on the set every day since shooting started in August [1956]."

Critical reaction
Bosley Crowther of The New York Times applauded Griffith's performance, writing Griffith "plays him [Lonesome Rhodes] with thunderous vigor". However, Crowther felt that the character Lonesome Rhodes overshadowed the rest of the cast and the story, in which he wrote: "As a consequence, the dominance of the hero and his monstrous momentum ... eventually become a bit monotonous when they are not truly opposed." Harrison's Reports wrote: "On a whole, however, it is a fascinating picture, superbly directed and finely acted. Much credit for the film's impact is due [to] Andy Griffith, a newcomer to the screen, for his exceptional performance in the principal role. It is not a sympathetic part, but he plays it with explosive vigor and makes the characterization entirely believable. Worthy of special mention, too, is Patricia Neal for her fine portrayal" as Marcia Jeffries.

Hy Hollinger of Variety praised the film as "provocative and hard-hitting", summarizing that "Kazan once again demonstrates his ability as a director and why major studios are willing to give him carte blanche in selecting his own story material and working under his own conditions." Edwin Schallert of the Los Angeles Times wrote, " Far and away outstanding in their stellar performances are Griffith, Miss Neal and Matthau, with Franciosa also very capable. They are nearly all at their peaks in their interpretations, even though the actual reading of lines is not too easy to understand at times. Schulberg has, however, written a splendid screenplay, and the picture is by far one of Kazan's most penetrating and incidentally ironic."

In his review for Cahiers du cinéma, François Truffaut, then a film critic, called it "a great and beautiful work whose importance transcends the dimensions of a cinema review". Karel Reisz, reviewing the film in Sight & Sound, critiqued more harshly, writing, "If we are to accept its attack on the jungle values of American sponsored television then we must be able to sense a more decent, rational tone in the film which is attacking them. And this becomes more and more difficult as the film goes on. When it comes to the test Kazan and Schulberg seem to have little more respect for their audience than the [t]elevision showmen. Dramatic scenes are all played at full blast, while the more intimate scenes are slurred over." Filmmaker Spike Lee credited the film with inspiring his landmark film Bamboozled.

A Face in the Crowd has an 89% rating on Rotten Tomatoes, based on 35 reviews, with an average rating of 8.1/10. The critical consensus reads, "A raucous Andy Griffith channels the corruptive influence of celebrity in Elia Kazan's A Face in the Crowd, a prescient critique of American media." On Metacritic, the film has a score of 72 based on 10 reviews, indicating "generally favorable reviews".

See also
 List of American films of 1957
 The Great Man

References

External links

 
 
 
 
 "Naming the Fictional Vitajex Pill in A Face in the Crowd (1957)"; Essay by Mark Griep
  Short stories including "Your Arkansas Traveler", pp. 3–44.
 
  A Face in the Crowd ranked #14.
 

1957 films
1957 drama films
1950s American films
1950s English-language films
1950s political drama films
1950s satirical films
American black-and-white films
American films about revenge
American political drama films
American satirical films
Films about advertising
Films about music and musicians
Films about radio people
Films about television
Films about television people
Films based on short fiction
Films directed by Elia Kazan
Films set in Arkansas
Films set in New York City
Films set in Tennessee
Films shot in Arkansas
Films shot in New York City
Films shot in Tennessee
Films with screenplays by Budd Schulberg
United States National Film Registry films
Warner Bros. films